Forest Park Museum and Arboretum is a 17-acre (69,000 m2)museum and arboretum located near Perry, Iowa. It is open year-round on weekdays and weekends April 1st to Nov 1st from 1:00 pm to 4:30 pm. There is no admission fee.

The museum and arboretum were originally developed on 5 acres (20,000 m2) in the 1940s by Eugene Hastie, a farmer and local historian of Dallas County. He planted his arboretum in straight lines to allow farming between the trees, and in 1953 opened his museum to the public. In 1966, the Dallas County Conservation Department purchased the site, and has subsequently added another 12 acres (49,000 m2) of re-established prairie and wildflowers. The museum displays unique artifacts; including a presidential autograph collection, a high quality Iowa book collection and the giant electric generator built by noted inventor Henry Nelson. Live animals and an increasing number of hands on family exhibits are also featured at the facility.

The arboretum contains over 100 species of primarily native trees and shrubs. 

Permanent museum displays include the last one-room school house of Dallas County (built 1867, closed 1961), early transportation and railroading memorabilia, farm machinery, small hand tools, and a blacksmith shop.

External links
Forest Park Museum

See also 
 List of botanical gardens in the United States

Arboreta in Iowa
Botanical gardens in Iowa
Museums in Dallas County, Iowa
History museums in Iowa
Open-air museums in Iowa
Protected areas of Dallas County, Iowa
Blacksmith shops